John Tillman (born February 11, 1965) is an American athlete. He competed in the men's triple jump at the 1992 Summer Olympics.

References

External links
 

1965 births
Living people
Athletes (track and field) at the 1992 Summer Olympics
American male triple jumpers
Olympic track and field athletes of the United States
Place of birth missing (living people)